Kraut is a German-language surname. Notable people with the surname Kraut include:

Bojan Kraut, a Slovene engineer
Dominik Kraut, a Czech football player
Laura Kraut, an American show jumping competitor
Ogden Kraut (1927-2002), American author
Richard Kraut, American professor
Robert E. Kraut, an American social psychologist

See also

German-language surnames